Sandlake is an unincorporated community in Tillamook County, Oregon, United States. It lies between Tillamook and Pacific City along Sandlake Road west of U.S. Route 101.

The community is named after a nearby body of water called Sand Lake along the Pacific coast. Postal authorities established a post office at this location on July 10, 1890, naming it Hembree after the first postmaster, A. J. Hembree. It was renamed Sandlake on January 18, 1898. The office remained open until May 1956.

References

Unincorporated communities in Tillamook County, Oregon
Unincorporated communities in Oregon